Dendrophorbium floribundum is a species of flowering plant in the family Asteraceae. It is found only in Ecuador. Its natural habitat is subtropical or tropical moist montane forests. It is threatened by habitat loss.

References

floribundum
Flora of Ecuador
Vulnerable plants
Taxonomy articles created by Polbot